Rollie's Follies: Hall of Fame Revue of Baseball Lists and Lore, Stories And Stats  was first published in 2009 by Clerisy Press. Baseball Hall of Famer Rollie Fingers enlists backstage humorist Yellowstone Ritter to develop an inventive look at baseball.

Synopsis 
The book is divided into 54 chapters including humorous lists, essays and the mustachioed MVP's own major league memories. The illustrations of Jerry Dowling (the award-winning Cincinnati cartoonist) nationally known for his caricatures of Marge Schott are used on the cover and throughout the book.

The chapters covers current baseball figures and historical facts with titles such as:

 "The Fallen Smelt"
 "The Phat Albert Dossier"
 "The All-Time Lefty Team"
 "The Japanese Factor"
 "Bucky Dent Revisited"
 "Disco Demolition Night"
 "Sausages and Presidents"
 "The Changing Role of the Closer (1950–2005)"
 "The Switch Is On" (The tale of switch-pitcher Pat Venditte successfully playing a game of cat and mouse against a switch-hitter)

2009 non-fiction books
Baseball pitching
Comedy books
History of baseball
Major League Baseball books
Major League Baseball lists
Trivia books